Multiracial Antiguans and Barbudans are Antiguans and Barbudans of more than one race or ethnicity. 

Multiracial people make up 4.73% of Antigua and Barbuda's population.

Statistics

References 

Ethnic groups in Antigua and Barbuda